Gustave Van de Woestijne (2 August 1881 – 21 April 1947) was a Belgian expressionist painter.

He belonged to the so-called "First Group of Latem", a group of artists who worked in the rural village of Sint-Martens-Latem on the banks of the Lys, near Ghent. He was the brother of the Flemish poet Karel Van de Woestijne. He was buried in the Cemetery of Campo Santo.

Honours 
 1919 : Knight of the Order of Leopold.

Works by him in the Royal Museum of Fine Arts, Antwerp

References

1881 births
1947 deaths
20th-century Belgian painters
Belgian Expressionist painters
Royal Academy of Fine Arts (Ghent) alumni